Fenning is a surname. Notable people with the surname include:

Elizabeth Fenning (1792–1815), domestic servant whose controversial conviction for attempted murder became a cause célèbre 
John Fenning (1885–1955), British doctor and rower who competed in the 1908 Summer Olympics
Paddy Fenning (born 1950), Irish retired sportsperson